Nash Ridge is a high, massive ridge of eastern Eisenhower Range, about 10 nautical miles (18 km) long and 5 nautical miles (9 km) wide, projecting between the flow of the O'Kane and Priestley Glaciers, in Victoria Land. Mapped by United States Geological Survey (USGS) from surveys and U.S. Navy air photos, 1955–63. Named by Advisory Committee on Antarctic Names (US-ACAN) for Harold A. Nash, biologist at McMurdo Station in the 1965-66 and 1966–67 seasons.

See also
Mount Borgstrom

Ridges of Victoria Land
Scott Coast